Ņina Maksimova (born 23 June 1986) is a Latvian footballer who plays as a goalkeeper. She has been a member of the Latvia women's national team.

References

1986 births
Living people
Latvian women's footballers
Women's association football goalkeepers
Gintra Universitetas players
FC Skonto/Cerība-46.vsk. players
Latvia women's youth international footballers
Latvia women's international footballers
Latvian expatriate footballers
Latvian expatriate sportspeople in Lithuania
Expatriate women's footballers in Lithuania